Wini Smart (1932-2017) was a watercolorist and oil painter of marine and landscapes, many of them scenes of Maine, and her specialty was watercolors. She was also a muralist, bas-relief sculptor, and illustrator including "Early History of Toms River and Dover Township."

Smart was born on  March 17, 1932, in Neptune, New Jersey. She studied at the Philadelphia Museum College of Art, the Fleisher Art Memorial in Philadelphia, and the Art Students League of New York. Smart maintained two galleries, one in Northeast Harbor, Maine, for 40 years; another in Boca Grande, Florida, since 1980. Smart married Fred Quackenbush in June 2010. Smart died on September 15, 2017.

Notes

External links
Personal Website of Wini Smart

20th-century American painters
21st-century American painters
Women watercolorists
University of the Arts (Philadelphia) alumni
American watercolorists
American women painters
20th-century American women artists
21st-century American women artists
People from Hancock County, Maine
1932 births
2017 deaths